Hans Oldag (March 2, 1901 – August 1978) was an American long-distance runner. He competed in the marathon at the 1932 Summer Olympics.

References

External links
 

1901 births
1978 deaths
Athletes (track and field) at the 1932 Summer Olympics
American male long-distance runners
American male marathon runners
Olympic track and field athletes of the United States
People from Ludwigslust-Parchim
German emigrants to the United States